Dr. Romantic is a South Korean television series starring Han Suk-kyu as the title character with Yoo Yeon-seok, Seo Hyun-jin in first season, Ahn Hyo-seop, Lee Sung-kyung in second and third season. The first season aired on SBS TV from November 7, 2016, to January 16, 2017, every Monday and Tuesday at 22:00 (KST). The second season aired from January 6 to February 25, 2020, every Monday and Tuesday at 21:40 (KST). The third season is scheduled to premiere in April 2023.

The first season received positive reception, recording over 20% in ratings. In addition, it also received positive reviews for its plot and Han Suk-kyu's performance.

Series overview

Synopsis

Season 1
A story about Boo Yong-joo (Han Suk-kyu), a triple-board certified surgeon, who was once at the top of his field and used to work at Seoul's top medical center, Geosan University Hospital. After a traumatic incident, he disappears and changes his name to Kim Sa-bu. He begins working at a small hospital named Doldam, located in Gangwon Province. He guides Kang Dong-joo (Yoo Yeon-seok) and Yoon Seo-jeong (Seo Hyun-jin) to become great doctors by teaching them to fight against power and money for the sake of patients.

Season 2
Three years following the events of first season, Kim Sa-bu visits Geosan University Hospital to recruit a general surgeon. He finds Seo Woo-jin (Ahn Hyo-seop), a doctor with a troubled past who is ostracized by his fellow doctors, and offers him the job. In the meantime, Cha Eun-jae (Lee Sung-kyung) is suspended after making another mistake in the operation room and has no other choice but to follow the two doctors to Doldam Hospital.

Cast

Character appearances

Main
 Han Suk-kyu as Kim Sa-bu (Teacher Kim) / Boo Yong-joo
 His real name is Boo Yong-joo, but he uses the name Kim Sa-bu. He is the only surgeon in South Korea who achieved triple-board certification in general surgery, cardiac surgery and neurosurgery. After the death of his junior in Geosan University Hospital, he isolates himself and moves to Doldam Hospital to become the Chief Surgeon there. In season two, Doldam Hospital is in need of a general surgeon, he visited Geosan University Hospital in Seoul to recruit one and quickly becomes interested in Seo Woo-jin and Cha Eun-jae. After learning about their skills and struggles through other doctors, he decides to recruit them.
 Yoo Yeon-seok as Kang Dong-joo
 Yoon Chan-young as young Kang Dong-joo
 Intelligent and armed with excellent skills, he has strong desire to succeed, but is held back due to his poor family background. He gets transferred to Doldam Hospital after a failed surgery on a VIP, which was an opportunity for him to prove his skills.
 Seo Hyun-jin as Yoon Seo-jung
 Shin Yi-joon as young Yoon Seo-jung
 She has a strong desire to be recognized more than anyone. She gets swayed by Dong-joo's romantic confession and feels guilty after the death of her boyfriend. After the accident, she disappears from Geosan University Hospital and is rescued by Kim Sa-bu after injuring herself. She then becomes a doctor at Doldam Hospital.
 Ahn Hyo-seop as Seo Woo-jin
 A second-year general surgery fellow. When he was young, he almost died when his parents committed suicide. He has since been struggling to survive, doing part-time jobs to pay for his medical studies and to pay back his family's debt. He has been fired from two hospitals, first because he was labeled as a whistleblower after testifying against his mentor, then because false rumors about his part-time jobs kept surrounding him. In need of money, he eventually accepts Teacher Kim's job offer but the latter is not sure about Woo-Jin's motives anymore. He has been in love with Eun-jae since medical school but has kept it a secret.
 Lee Sung-kyung as Cha Eun-jae
 A second-year cardiothoracic surgery fellow. She was a top student at medical school, often in competition with Woo-jin with whom she had a complicated relationship, but she cannot bear to do a surgery without vomiting or falling asleep when she takes medicine. She is thus suspended and has to work for Teacher Kim before she can go back to the main hospital. She realizes her love for Woo-Jin at the end of the series.
 Kim Joo-hun as Park Min-gook
 A professor of general surgery and the new director of Doldam Hospital. He once ran away from a bus accident while Teacher Kim was risking his life to save an unconscious person and has since decided to surpass the doctor's skills.

Supporting
People of Doldam Hospital
 Kim Hong-pa as Yeo Woon-young
 An internal medicine specialist and director of Doldam Hospital. A proud doctor who lost his motivation after the death of his wife. In season two, he was dismissed by Do Yoon-wan as the director of Doldam Hospital.
 Jin Kyung as Oh Myung-sim
 Head nurse. A woman with strong will, who is able to stand up to Kim Sa-bu. She seems strict, but has a warm heart and cares about her patients.
 Im Won-hee as Jang Gi-tae
 Manager of Doldam Hospital. He is known to be an opportunist and always want the best for the hospital, trying to find ways to promote it in any way he can.
 Byun Woo-min as Nam Do-il
 A freelance anesthesiologist. He usually runs a restaurant, but due to his average cooking skills, his only customers are usually Doldam doctors.
 Kim Min-jae as Park Eun-tak
 A nurse at Doldam Hospital. He harbors a crush on Woo Yeon-hwa. He first met Teacher Kim after being admitted as a patient. It was a life-changing encounter as he then decided to go to nursing school and eventually started working at Doldam Hospital himself.
 Seo Eun-soo as Woo Yeon-hwa
 A staff member who likes Dong-joo. Later, she comes back as a doctor at Doldam Hospital.
 Lee Gyu-ho as Mr. Gu
 An orderly who also serves as guard when there are agitated patients or people at the hospital.
 Shin Dong-wook as Bae Moon-jeong
 An orthopedic surgery specialist. He was Woo-jin's and Eun-jae's senior at medical school and started working at Doldam Hospital a month prior to his juniors' arrival.
 So Joo-yeon as Yoon Ah-reum
 A fourth-year emergency medicine resident. She has a bright personality and applied to Doldam Hospital after seeing Teacher Kim help patients in the emergency room of Geosan University Hospital.
 Yoon Na-moo as Jeong In-soo
 An emergency medicine specialist. He is the only doctor who stayed at Doldam among the few who were forced to leave Geosan University Hospital for the branch, back in 2016.
 Jung Ji-ahn as Uhm Hyun-jung
 An emergency room nurse.
 Yoon Bo-ra as Joo Young-mi
 An emergency room nurse. She recently started working at Doldam Hospital.
 Kim Yong-jin as Chief Lee
 Chief of Administration at Doldam Hospital.
 Lee Shin-young as Jang Dong-hwa
 The youngest doctor in Daldam Hospital, which characterizes the MZ generation seeking an independent lifestyle while studying for their third year as a GS.
 Lee Hong-nae as Lee Sun-woong
 A new arrival doctor full of spirit and passion, In which he is a former military doctor.

People of Geosan University Hospital
 Choi Jin-ho as Do Yoon-wan
 Director of Geosan University Hospital. In season two, he became the Chairman of Geosan University Foundation following the death of Shin Myung-ho. Though he is not outstanding as a doctor, his political skills are recognized and he intends to use them to shape Doldam Hospital the way he envisions it.
 Yang Se-jong as Do In-bum
 Yoon-wan's son. He went to the same college and was in the same class as Dong-joo. He wants to be acknowledged by his father and feels inferior to Dong-joo who has excellent skills without a good background. He also harbours a crush on Seo-jung.
 Jang Hyuk-jin as Song Hyun-cheol
 Chief of Surgery at Geosan University Hospital. He is from a poor family and has a strong desire for success.
 Joo Hyun as Chairman Shin
 Owner of Jungsun Casino and the hidden Chairman of Geosan Foundation.

Park Min-gook's staff
 Go Sang-ho as Yang Ho-joon
 A third-year general surgery fellow. He is surgeon's assistant to Park Min-gook. Though Ho-joon fears him, his loyalty to Min-gook led him to follow the doctor to Doldam Hospital. 
 Park Hyo-joo as Shim Hye-jin
 A professor of anesthesiology at Geosan University Hospital. She is an authoritative but kind woman who experienced death and suffering in her life.
 Bae Myung-jin as Heo Yeong-gyoo
 A nurse at Geosan University Hospital.

Others

 Seo Young as Chairman Shin's assistant
 Kim Ji-eun as Yoon-wan's secretary
 Park Min-jung as Min-jung
 Kim Bo-jung as a nurse
 Lee Chae-eun as a nurse
 Jin Ah-rin
 Lee Yong-yi as a mother of a patient (Ep. 3)
 Ri Min as a truck driver (Ep. 4)
 Lee Jin-kwon
 Ko Jin-ho
 Lee Cheol-min as Kang Seung-ho (Ep. 7–8)
 Lee Myung-haeng as a psychotherapist (Ep. 8–9)
 Shin Seung-hwan as a webtoon writer and patient at Doldam hospital (Ep. 9–10)
 Park Seung-tae as a patient (Ep. 10) 
 Kim Joon-won as Inspector Choi 
 Kim Dan-woo as Inspector Choi's daughter 
 Shin Yeon-suk
 Lee Kang-uk as a patient and driver who caused a six-fold collision by drunk driving  
 Lee Jae-wook
 Heo Joon-seok
 Kang Eui-sik as Park Joo-hyuk, the runaway soldier
 Han Kab-soo as Park Joo-hyuk's father
 Son Yeong-Soon as a patient's wife 
 Park Yeong-soo as the general manager of the Disease Control Center Department
 Park Doo-shik as Soo-jung's boyfriend (Ep. 13–14)
 Lee Jin-kwon as Supporting
 Jo I-hyun as a patient
 Jeon Min-seo
 Jung Soo-hwan as a high school student
 Kim Se-joon as a paramedic transferring patients to Doldam Hospital
 Kim Min-sang as Reporter Oh Sung-jae (Ep. 16–17)
 Lee Jae-woo as Ahn woo-yeol (Ep. 16–17)
 Kim Ji-eun as President Do Yoon-wan's secretary
 Lee Jung-sung

 Lee Ho-cheol as loan shark
 Lim Cheol-soo as loan shark
 Kim Jong-tae as Professor Oh
A professor of cardiothoracic surgery at Geosan University Hospital.
 Kang Yoo-seok as Joon Young
A prisoner and patient.
 Kim Jin as Choi Soon-young
A paramedic and organ donor.
 Lee Ji-hyun as Soon-young's mother
 Kwon Hyeok-soo as Mr. Ryu
Minister of National Defense.
 Kim Dong-hyun as a violent husband

 Lee Geung-young 
 Eun-jae's father.
 Ha Dong-joon 
 Seo Dong-hyun

Special appearances

 Tae In-ho as Dr. Moon Tae-hwa, Yoon Seo-jung's boyfriend. He died due to brain hemorrhage after a car accident. (Ep. 1–2)
 Moon Ji-in as a doctor and Yoon Seo-jung's friend (Ep. 1)
 Hwang Chan-sung as Young Gyun (Ep. 8, 11–12)
 Kim Jung-young as Dong-joo's mom
 Kim Hye-eun as Shin Hyun-jung (Ep. 14–18)
 Kim Hye-soo as Dr. Lee Young-jo (Ep. 20–21)

 Joo Hyun as Shin Myung-ho (Ep. 1)
 Yang Se-jong as Do In-beom (Ep 10, 14–15)
 Jung Hyeon-jun as Lee Dong-woo's son (Ep. 13)
 Jeong Bo-seok as Bae Moon-jeong's father (Ep. 15–16)
 Seo Young as Manager Joo (Ep. 15–16)
 Kim Hye-eun as Shin Hyun-jung (Ep. 16)

 Joo Hyun-young
 Ha Yoon-kyung
 Joo Jong-hyuk
 Im Seong-jae

Production

Season 1 
First script reading took place September 13, 2016, at SBS Ilsan Production Studios in Goyang, Gyeonggi Province, South Korea. Filming started on September 23.

Season 2 
The first script reading took place in September 2019 at SBS Ilsan Production Studios in Goyang, Gyeonggi Province, South Korea.

Han Suk-kyu, Kim Hong-pa, Jin Kyung, Im Won-hee, Byun Woo-min, Kim Min-jae, Choi Jin-ho, Jang Hyuk-jin, Yang Se-jong, Lee Gyu-ho and Yoon Na-moo reprised their roles from the first season.

Season 3 
In September 2021, it was reported that production for Season 3 would begin in late 2021, but filming had to be postponed due to the actor's schedule and the outbreak of the COVID-19 virus. Season 3 is scheduled to be filmed with the goal of broadcasting in the first half of 2023. 

Han Suk-kyu, Ahn Hyo-seop, Lee Sung-kyung, Byun Woo-min, Jung Ji-an, Im Won-hee, Jin Kyung, So Joo-yeon, Yoon Na-moo, Kim Min-jae, Shin Dong-wook, Yoon Bora, Lee Shin-young and Lee Hong-nae has confirmed the casting for season 3.

Original soundtrack

Season 1

Season 2

Reception

Audience viewership

Awards and nominations

References

External links
 Dr. Romantic (Season 1) at SBS 
 Dr. Romantic (Season 2) at SBS 
 
 
 

Korean-language television shows
Seoul Broadcasting System television dramas
2016 South Korean television series debuts
2017 South Korean television series endings
2020 South Korean television series debuts
2020 South Korean television series endings
South Korean medical television series
South Korean melodrama television series
South Korean romance television series
Television shows written by Kang Eun-kyung
Television series by Samhwa Networks